Ron Benefiel was the eighth president of Nazarene Theological Seminary in Kansas City, Missouri. His term as president was July 2000 – June 2011. Benefiel currently serves as the Dean of the School of Theology and Christian Ministry at Point Loma Nazarene University in San Diego California.

During Benefiel's presidency, NTS embraced the challenge of becoming a "missional seminary serving a missional church." The school expanded its focus globally and began offering courses in new formats, including online and video  conferencing. The seminary has more recently developed collaborative partnerships providing the opportunity for NTS coursework to be offered at several Nazarene college campuses.

While serving as a PLNU professor from 1996 to 2000, Benefiel  co-founded and co-pastored Mid City Church of the Nazarene with John Wright, Ph.D., and David Whitelaw, D.Th. Mid City is now a thriving multi-congregational church.

From 1982 to 1996, Benefiel served as pastor of the First  Church of the Nazarene in Los Angeles, a multi-congregational church. He also founded and served as the executive director  of the P.F. Bresee Foundation, a nonprofit community center  in LA's Mid-Wilshire district.

Benefiel has always had a passion for serving his community, and his name has been highly respected within the Church of the Nazarene. Over the past 40 years, he has served the denomination on numerous councils and boards related to education, research, and youth ministry. His work in the community has included serving on the board of directors of  the Kansas City Urban Youth Center and of rescue missions  in Los Angeles, San Diego, and Kansas City.

Benefiel received his B.A., M.A., and an honorary Doctor of Letters degree from PLNU. He earned his Ph.D. in sociology  from the University of Southern California.

He graduated from Point Loma Nazarene University with a A.B., M.A., Litt. D., and University of Southern California with a Ph.D.

References

External links
"Languages of Holiness: The Autobiography of a Seeker", NNU, February 2007
"Dr. Ron Benefiel", Southern Nazarene University April 22, 2009

Year of birth missing (living people)
Living people
American theologians
Point Loma Nazarene University alumni
University of Southern California alumni
Nazarene Theological Seminary faculty
Nazarene theologians